Sirtuin 4, also known as SIRT4, is a mitochondrial protein which in humans is encoded by the SIRT4 gene. SIRT4 is member of the mammalian sirtuin family of proteins, which are homologs to the yeast Sir2 protein. SIRT4 exhibits NAD+-dependent deacetylase activity.

Function
SIRT4 is a mitochondrial ADP-ribosyltransferase that inhibits mitochondrial glutamate dehydrogenase 1 activity, thereby downregulating insulin secretion in response to amino acids. A deacetylation of malonyl-CoA decarboxylase enzyme by SIRT4 represses the enzyme activity, inhibiting fatty acid oxidation in muscle and liver cells. SIRT4 has a suppressive effect on peroxisome proliferator-activated receptor alpha (PPAR-α) which downregulates fatty acid oxidation in liver cells.  Deacetylation of ADP/ATP translocase 2 (ANT2) increases cellular ATP by dampening mitochondrial uncoupling.

Clinical significance
SIRT4 is a mitochondrial tumor suppressor protein. Overexpression of SIRT4 inhibits cancer cell proliferation by inhibition of glutamine metabolism.

References

Further reading